Samuel “Sam” Mark Lavelle (born 3 October 1996) is a professional footballer who plays as a defender for Burton Albion on loan from Charlton Athletic. Born in England, he represented Scotland at youth international level.

Club career

Blackburn Rovers
Lavelle began his career with Blackburn Rovers, leaving at the end of the 2015–16 season.

Bolton Wanderers
He signed for Bolton Wanderers for the 2016–17 season. He was not retained for the 2017–18 season due to the club's transfer embargo; he spoke about how he felt he had been left "hung out to dry" and that the EFL "[were] punishing a young English player instead of Bolton Wanderers."

Morecambe
On 1 August 2017, he signed for Morecambe, being assigned the number 16 shirt until the expiry of his contract on 30 June 2018. Lavelle made his debut as a 93rd minute substitute for the League Two club, on 5 August, in the first competitive game of the season against Cheltenham Town in a 2–1 home win. He scored his first goal for Morecambe in a 4-3 EFL Cup defeat at Barnsley on 8 August 2017.

In November 2017 he received a two-match ban for "deception" after falsely winning a penalty.

He signed a new contract with the club in April 2018., and then a further one in October 2019.

In recent times Sam Lavelle acquired the captain's armband for the Shrimps.

On 31 May 2021, Lavelle captained Morecambe in their League Two play-off final victory, in doing so securing promotion to League One for the Shrimps for the first time in the club's history. This resulted in many supporters regarding him as one of the clubs' all-time greats.

Charlton Athletic
On 31 August 2021, Lavelle signed for Charlton Athletic on a three-year deal for an undisclosed fee.

He scored his first Charlton goal in his second appearance for the club in a 2-1 League One defeat at Wycombe Wanderers on 18 September 2021.

Burton Albion (loan)
On 31 January 2023, Lavelle joined Burton Albion on loan until the end of the 2022–23 season.

Career statistics

Honours

Morecambe
EFL League Two play-offs: 2021

References 

1996 births
Living people
Sportspeople from Blackpool
Scottish footballers
Scotland youth international footballers
English footballers
English people of Scottish descent
Association football defenders
Morecambe F.C. players
Bolton Wanderers F.C. players
Blackburn Rovers F.C. players
Charlton Athletic F.C. players
Burton Albion F.C. players